In 1976, the Italian chemist, Giovanni Piancatelli and coworkers developed a new method to synthesize 4-hydroxycyclopentenone derivatives from 2-furylcarbinols through an acid-catalyzed rearrangement. This discovery occurred when Piancatelli was studying heterocyclic steroids and their reactive abilities in an acidic environment. As this rearrangement has continued to be studied, it has become a commonly used rearrangement in natural product synthesis because of the ability to create 4-hydroxy-5-substitutedcyclopent-2-enones. Piancatelli’s motive for looking into this new rearrangement stemmed from the ever present 3-oxycyclopentene molecule, specifically its 5-hydroxy derivative, found in biologically active natural products.

Reaction Mechanism
The mechanism of this reaction is proposed to be a 4-π electrocyclization very much like the Nazarov cyclization reaction. To obtain the 2-furyl carbinols, Piancatelli subjected furfural, an inedible biomass, to a Grignard reaction. This is then submitted to acid-catalyzed hydrolysis to cause a molecular rearrangement and obtain the final 2-furyl carbinols.

It was proposed by Piancatelli that the reaction is a thermal electrocyclic reaction of a conrotatory 4π electron system while studying specifics of the mechanism conditions when synthesizing the 4-hydroxycyclopentenone derivatives. This mechanism was suggested when studying 1H NMR spectra as it became apparent that the final products exclusively delivered the trans isomer.

Piancatelli's Proposed Mechanism

In Piancatelli's proposed mechanism, the formation of the carbocation due to a protonation-dehydration sequence results in the two hydroxy groups being anti allowing for the trans-4hydroxy-5-substituted-cyclopent-2-enone from a 4π electrocylization ring closure.

Alternative Mechanisms

D'Auria proposed a possible mechanism that included zwitterionic intermediates as a way to form the cis isomer alongside the abundant trans isomer of the 2-furylcarbinol. D'Auria performed the rearrangement in boiling water without an acid catalyst.

Another proposed mechanism is from Yin and co-workers that was studied while completing the rearrangement of 2-furylcarbinols with a hydroxyalkyl chain at the 5 position. Yin rationalized the mechanism by utilizing an aldol-type intramolecular addition.

Reaction Conditions
The harness of the reaction conditions needed for the rearrangement differed based upon the reactivity of the substrates. Piancatelli observed that the more reactive substrates such as 5-methyl-2-furylcarbinols can undergo the rearrangement with much milder conditions in order to avoid any possible side products. Lewis acids were discovered to help drive the reaction to completion as long as there was an equimolar ratio, whereas alkyl groups on the hydroxy-bearing carbon leave the starting material more stable and cause longer reaction times and lower yields with the formation of side products due to the increased reactivity of those carbocations.

Applications of the Rearrangement
An important use of the Piancatelli rearrangement that was studied by Piancatelli himself is the synthesis of prostaglandins and their derivatives. Piancatelli was able to synthesize key intermediates for the preparation of prostanoic acid starting from his 2-furylcarbinols bearing a second functional group. This study was able to demonstrate the versatility of the sequence of the rearrangement.

A few of the products synthesized due to utilizing the Piancatelli rearrangement include: 3E,5Z-misoprostol, enisoprost, 4-fluoro-enisoprost, 2-normisoprostol, prostaglandin E1 (PGE1), ent-phytoprostane E1, 16-epi-phytoprostane E1, bimatoprost, and travoprost. (show key rxn used)

References

Carbon-carbon bond forming reactions
Rearrangement reactions
Name reactions